= Remternetug =

Monoclonal antibody

Monoclonal antibody
- Type: ?

Clinical data
- Other names: LY3372993; LY-3372993

Legal status
- Legal status: Investigational

Identifiers
- CAS Number: 2571940-41-3
- UNII: A5HTA4J6ME

Remternetug is an experimental anti-amyloid monoclonal antibody that targets pyroglutamate Aβ. It is developed by Eli Lilly and Company.
